Sporting Clube Petróleos de Cabinda is an Angolan football club based in Cabinda. They play their home games at the Estádio do Chiazi or Estádio Municipal do Tafe..

Achievements
Angolan League: 0

Angolan Cup: 0

Angolan SuperCup: 0

Angolan 2nd Division: 2 (2011, 2013)

League and cup positions

Recent seasons
Domant FC's season-by-season performance since 2011:

 PR = Preliminary round, 1R = First round, GS = Group stage, R32 = Round of 32, R16 = Round of 16, QF = Quarter-finals, SF = Semi-finals

Players and staff

Players

Staff

Manager history and performance

See also
 Girabola
 Gira Angola

References

External links
 Girabola.com profile
 Zerozero.pt profile

Football clubs in Angola
Sports clubs in Angola
Association football clubs established in 1975